El Cuero is a Norwegian rock group formed in Kristiansund by brothers Håvard and Brynjar Takle Ohr in 2005. As of 2017, they have released five studio albums, one live album and an EP.

History

Formation and early albums
The band was formed in 2005 by brothers Håvard (drums) and Brynjar Takle Ohr (guitars, vocals). The two had played in several bands together since childhood, but had a falling out that left them estranged for several years, by their own admission as they "grew tired of each other" after constantly working and living together for nearly two decades. In what would be their final meeting in several years, the brothers angrily chased each other around in a crowded restaurant, one of them allegedly brandishing a steak knife, an incident they have since humorously referred to as "typical sibling rivalry". Reuniting in 2005, they were joined by friends and fellow musicians Øyvind Blomstrøm (guitars) and Tommy Reite (bass) to complete the line-up. After spending their formative years touring smaller venues whilst writing and creating music, the band entered Caliban Studios in Oslo to record their eponymous debut album in early 2007. Released to positive reviews by the Norwegian media, the album sold fairly well but failed to give the band mainstream attention. Nevertheless, the group commenced touring in support of the record, while continuing to create new music.

Less than a year later, the band returned to the studio to record their follow-up album. Released in 2008, A Glimmer of Hope was met with universal praise from both media and fans, making the band a mainstream feature for the first time. The band soon embarked on an extensive tour to support the album. They also attracted attention from other artists, among them Jackson Browne, who singled them out for praise while on tour in Norway.

Mainstream success
Following the success of their previous album, the band had embarked on what would be their longest tour yet, spanning nearly two years, taking advantage of the publicity that followed their successful album. Not until the fall of 2010 did the band announce a return to the studio, to begin work on their third studio album. On March 8, 2011, the band announced that the album would be titled From Mountains to Sand, with the first single from the album, entitled "Footprints", released ten days later alongside the music video. Released on May 27, 2011, the album entered both the Norwegian iTunes album chart and national album charts at number one. The band resumed touring, whilst also taking the time to work on other projects, most notably as backing artists for Egil Hegerberg both in studio and in concert.

In September 2012, the band revealed that twelve songs had been recorded for an upcoming fourth album, with plans for an early 2013 release. The entire album had been written and recorded in complete secrecy in what the members described as "a three-week jam session". To avoid distractions and interruptions, the band had rented an old, abandoned school building, where they stayed during the entire three-week period with only a handful of people knowing and having access. On November 28, the album's first single, "My Dark America" was released on the band's YouTube channel, along with confirmation that the album would be released on February 8, 2013. The album was later postponed due to a delay in the production of the artwork for the album, which would be titled Victor's Justice. The album was eventually released on March 8, 2013, once again to overwhelmingly positive reviews. During the subsequent four-month tour, the band recorded and produced their first live album, El Cuero's Justice - Live!, which was released on October 11, 2013, only seven months after their previous album, their shortest span between albums to date. In January 2014, it was announced that El Cuero had been selected by NRK as one of the entries for the third semi-final of the 2014 Melodi Grand Prix, the Norwegian qualifier for the Eurovision Song Contest. Their entry, "Ain't No Love (In This City No More)", eventually reached the final, where it was beaten by advance favorite "Silent Storm". It is to date the only song recorded by the band exclusively as a single, without appearing on an album or EP. Following their participation, the band spent the rest of the year working on separate projects and ventures, including a prolonged period as touring musicians for Egil Hegerberg and his Bare Egil Band.

On September 2, 2015, after a prolonged break from touring, the band released "Too Late To Go Back", their first new track in eighteen months. While initially exclusive to streaming service Tidal, the single was released to Spotify, iTunes and other outlets two days later. At the same time, the band revealed that their upcoming fifth album, Souls Under Red Light, would be released on October 20. Following the release, the band embarked on a supporting tour of the album, with guitarist Øyvind Blomstrøm taking a leave of absence, being temporarily replaced by Vegard Strand Holthe. After the tour ended in February 2016, it was announced the Blomstrøm had departed the band to pursue new projects, with Holthe becoming his full-time replacement. The three-track EP The Truth, the Passion, and the Blues, released in August 2016, featured Blomstrøms final recordings with the group.

Recent activity
The band was slated to headline the Skyhøyt Music Festival in Molde in August 2017, until the festival was abruptly cancelled due to financial issues. A few weeks later, the band announced the long-awaited re-release of their debut album on October 13, 2017, featuring remastered sound and unreleased bonus tracks. The release, commemorating the ten year anniversary of the album, will be accompanied by a twelve-date tour starting on October 14, and ending with an anniversary concert in their home town of Kristiansand on December 29.

Band members

Current
 Brynjar Takle Ohr (2005—present) - lead vocals, guitars
 Håvard Takle Ohr (2005—present) - drums, percussion, backing vocals
 Tommy Reite (2005—present) - bass, backing vocals
 Vegard Strand Holthe (2015—present) - guitars, backing vocals (touring 2015-16, full-time since 2016)

Former
 Øyvind Blomstrøm (2005—2016) - guitars, backing vocals

Discography 
As of October 2017, the band has released five studio albums, one live album and one EP. All albums are available in CD and LP formats, as well as digital.

Albums

Singles and EPs
 "Footprints" (single) - March 18, 2011
 "My Dark America" - November 28, 2012
 "Ain't No Love (In The City No More)" - January 2014
 "Too Late To Go Back" - September 2, 2015 (Tidal-only), September 4, 2015 (worldwide)
 The Truth, the Passion, and the Blues - August 11, 2016

References

External links

Norwegian country rock groups
Norwegian rock music groups
Musical groups established in 2005
2005 establishments in Norway
Musical groups from Kristiansund